The 2017 Alcorn State Braves football team represented Alcorn State University in the 2017 NCAA Division I FCS football season. The Braves were led by second-year head coach Fred McNair and played their home games at Casem-Spinks Stadium in Lorman, Mississippi as members of the East Division of the Southwestern Athletic Conference (SWAC). They finished the season 7–5, 5–2 in SWAC play to win the East Division. They lost the SWAC Championship Game to Grambling State.

Schedule

The game between Alcorn State and FIU was relocated to Legion Field at Birmingham, Alabama due to Hurricane Irma.
Source: Schedule

Game summaries

Miles

at FIU

McNeese State

Southern

at Texas Southern

at Alabama State

Prairie View A&M

at Grambling State

Alabama A&M

Mississippi Valley State

at Jackson State

vs. Grambling State (SWAC Championship)

References

Alcorn State
Alcorn State Braves football seasons
Alcorn State Braves football